Šateikiai eldership is an eldership in Plungė District Municipality to the west from Plungė. The administrative center is Šateikiai.

Largest villages 
Šateikiai
Narvaišiai 
Aleksandravas 
Kadaičiai 
Papieviai 
Alksnėnai 
Vydeikiai 
Sėleniai

Other villages

References 

Elderships in Plungė District Municipality